North Dorset by-election may refer to:

 1905 North Dorset by-election
 1937 North Dorset by-election
 1957 North Dorset by-election